The Russian Second Division 1999 was the eighth edition of the Russian Second Division. There were 6 zones with 108 teams starting the competition (1 was excluded before the end of the season).

Zone West

Overview

Standings

Top goalscorers
22 goals
Anatoli Balaluyev (FC Avtomobilist Noginsk)

20 goals
Aleksandr Rogulin (FC Oazis Yartsevo)

19 goals
 Andrey Movsisyan (FC Sportakademklub Moscow)
Andrei Shershen (FC Mosenergo Moscow)

15 goals
Igor Tikhonov (FC Avtomobilist Noginsk)

14 goals
Dmitri Batynkov (FC Avtomobilist Noginsk)
Sergei Domrachyov (FC Volochanin-89 Vyshny Volochyok)

13 goals
Dmitri Akimov (FC Zenit-2 St. Petersburg)

12 goals
Maksim Grevtsev (FC Spartak Shchyolkovo)
Sergei Kondratyev (FC Avtomobilist Noginsk)
Dmitri Podshivalov (FC Dynamo-2 Moscow)

Zone Centre

Overview

Standings

Top goalscorers
26 goals
Aleksandr Katasonov (FC Spartak-Chukotka Moscow)
Vladimir Kharin (FC Lokomotiv Liski)

23 goals
Sergei Lutovinov (FC Spartak-Chukotka Moscow)

21 goals
Maksim Olkhovik (FC Spartak Lukhovitsy)

20 goals
Sergei Pervushin (FC Spartak Tambov)

18 goals
Andrei Boldin (FC Kolomna)
Ruslan Nezamendinov (FC Kosmos Elektrostal)

15 goals
Yevgeni Losev (FC Lokomotiv Kaluga)

14 goals
Yevgeni Kuzka (FC Spartak Ryazan)

13 goals
Andrei Meshchaninov (FC Kosmos Elektrostal)

Zone South

Overview

Standings

Top goalscorers
34 goals
Isa Markhiyev (FC Angusht Nazran)

20 goals
Stanislav Lebedintsev (FC SKA Rostov-on-Don)
Andrey Perederiy (FC Avtodor Vladikavkaz)

19 goals
Ruslan Kunikhov (FC Druzhba Maykop)

18 goals
 Iuri Gabiskiria (FC Kuban Krasnodar)
Sergey Maslov (FC Rostselmash-2 Rostov-on-Don)

14 goals
Soslan Torchinov (FC Avtodor Vladikavkaz)

13 goals
Vitali Makarenko (FC Kavkazkabel Prokhladny)
Aleksei Surinov (FC Zhemchuzhina-2 Sochi)

12 goals
Ladin Apshev (FC Kavkazkabel Prokhladny)
Spartak Gogniyev (FC Avtodor Vladikavkaz)
Viktor Korban (FC SKA Rostov-on-Don)

Zone Povolzhye

Overview

Standings

Top goalscorers
27 goals
Aleksei Vereshchak (FC Lada Togliatti)

25 goals
Igor Mordvinov (FC Torpedo Pavlovo)

18 goals
Dmitri Timofeyev (FC Diana Volzhsk)

17 goals
Dmitri Golubev (FC Metallurg Vyksa)
Vladimir Pronin (FC Volga Ulyanovsk)

14 goals
Maksim Bondarenko (FC Rotor-2 Volgograd)
Vitali Ivanov (FC Balakovo)
Sergei Ulanov (FC Torpedo Arzamas)

13 goals
Rustyam Fakhrutdinov (FC Lada Togliatti)
Aleksandr Fedoseyev (FC Zenit Penza)
Sergei Panov (FC Balakovo)

Zone Ural

Overview

Standings

Top goalscorers
19 goals
Mikhail Tyufyakov (FC Dynamo Perm)

15 goals
Vladimir Filippov (FC Nosta Novotroitsk)
Vladimir Raykov (FC Zenit Chelyabinsk)

14 goals
Vitali Kakunin (FC UralAZ Miass)

12 goals
Stanislav Filonov (FC Metallurg-Metiznik Magnitogorsk)
Arnold Slabodich (FC Neftekhimik Nizhnekamsk)

11 goals
Sergei Budylin (FC Neftekhimik Nizhnekamsk)
Konstantin Nizovtsev (FC Dynamo Perm)
Albert Tsarayev (FC KamAZ-Chally Naberezhnye Chelny)
 Ruslan Uzakov (FC Nosta Novotroitsk)

Zone East

Overview

Standings

Top goalscorers
23 goals
Stanislav Chaplygin (FC Metallurg Novokuznetsk)

17 goals
Oleg Lidrik (FC Chkalovets Novosibirsk)

13 goals
Yuri Shpiryuk (FC Chkalovets Novosibirsk)

12 goals
Rezo Dzhikiya (FC Zvezda Irkutsk)
Andrei Ponomaryov (FC Sibiryak Bratsk)
Sergei Rogalevsky (FC Kuzbass Kemerovo)

11 goals
Andrei Korovin (FC Amur-Energiya Blagoveshchensk)
Roman Melnik (FC Luch Vladivostok)
Vladislav Yarkin (FC Dynamo Barnaul / FC Metallurg Novokuznetsk)

10 goals
Aleksei Poddubskiy (FC SKA-Energiya Khabarovsk)
 Ihor Yefremov (FC Amur-Energiya Blagoveshchensk)
Dmitri Zlobin (FC Chkalovets Novosibirsk)

Promotion play-offs

Nosta won 4–3 on aggregate and was promoted to the 2000 Russian First Division.

Spartak-Chukotka won 5–2 on aggregate and was promoted to the 2000 Russian First Division.

Lada Togliatti won 3–2 on aggregate and was promoted to the 2000 Russian First Division.

See also
1999 Russian Top Division
1999 Russian First Division

External links
Russian Second Division 1999 at Footballfacts

3
1999
Russia
Russia